Justin Michael Mentell (December 16, 1982 – February 1, 2010) was an American artist and actor. He was best known for his role as Garrett Wells on Boston Legal. He died in a car accident in Iowa County, Wisconsin.

Life and career
Mentell was born in Austin, Texas. He made his stage debut at three years of age as an orphan in Miss Liberty, and went on to appear in local theater productions, among them the musical Peter Pan, in which he portrayed one of the Lost Boys. After the family moved to Waukegan, Illinois, Mentell joined the Northbrook Children's Theater, where he continued to perform on stage. He also took up speed skating, placing third at the Junior Olympics and eventually becoming a member of the U.S. Speedskating's junior national long track team.

Mentell attended Northern Illinois University (NIU), where he majored in acting. He appeared in several plays there, including Balm in Gilead, The Play's the Thing and Never the Sinner. During his sophomore year, he trained at the Moscow Art Theatre, as part of a summer exchange program sponsored by NIU's School of Theater and Dance.

At NIU he also appeared in several independent films, including At the Still Point, for which he received the Golden Reel Award for Best Actor at its 2005 Film Festival. He also appeared in "Gotham III" in 2004 and used his speed-skating skills to land a role in the 2004 roller derby comedy Roll Bounce.

Mentell was a member of the cast of television dramedy Boston Legal as Garrett Wells. He played the role from the first episode of season 2 through February 2006. His 2009 projects included Death Walks the Streets and the Jerry Bruckheimer-produced live-action/animated family feature G-Force for Walt Disney Pictures, which was released in theaters July 24, 2009.

The film 5-25-77, which was released at the end of 2022, almost 12 years after his death, is Mentell's last and final film appearance.

Death

On February 1, 2010, Mentell died in a car crash near Hollandale, Wisconsin. According to the Iowa County Sheriff's Office, Mentell was pronounced dead at the scene around 9 a.m.  The accident was said to have taken place around 3:30 a.m. after his 2005 Jeep left the roadway on Highway 39, went down an embankment and struck two trees.  One unconfirmed possibility is that he had fallen asleep at the wheel, though his Jeep was not discovered until later in the day by a passing farmer who alerted authorities.  He was not wearing a seat belt and was ejected from the vehicle.

Filmography

References

External links

Justin Mentell at skateresults.com
Official site

1982 births
2010 deaths
American male child actors
American male film actors
American male speed skaters
American male stage actors
Male actors from Austin, Texas
Male actors from Illinois
Actors from Waukegan, Illinois
Road incident deaths in Wisconsin